Unmuzzled OX was a quarterly of poetry, art and politics founded in 1971 by poet Michael Andre, edited in New York City and Kingston, Ontario. Aided by artist Erika Rothenberg, the best-known issue was The Poets' Encyclopedia, the world's basic knowledge transformed by 225 poets, artists, musicians and novelists.  The circulation of Unmuzzled OX peaked at 25,000 in the 80s with The Cantos (121-150) Ezra Pound. Regular contributors to Unmuzzled OX included  Allen Ginsberg, Andy Warhol, John Cage, Daniel Berrigan, Eugene McCarthy, Margaret Atwood, Denise Levertov, Robert Peters, Robert Creeley and Gregory Corso. OX frequently features photographs of contributors by Gerard Malanga. Unmuzzled OX was located near the World Trade Center, and a translation by W. H. Auden of an opera by Carlo Goldoni appeared shortly before September 11, 2001. The publication ran until 2001, and most publications are still available.

References

Bibliography
 Unmuzzled OX (volume 1-17; New York, N.Y. and Kingston, Ont.; 1971-)

External links
 University of Tulsa McFarlin Library's inventory of the Unmuzzled Ox archive housed in their special collections department.
 Unmuzzled OX (volume 1-17; New York, N.Y. and Kingston, Ont.; 1971-) 
 Unmuzzled OX Group
 Unmuzzled OX, Volume 13, New York 1976

Visual arts magazines published in Canada
Poetry magazines published in Canada
Quarterly magazines published in Canada
Defunct political magazines published in Canada
Defunct literary magazines published in Canada
Magazines established in 1971
Magazines disestablished in 2001
Magazines published in Ontario